The retinoic acid receptor (RAR) is a type of nuclear receptor which can also act as a ligand-activated transcription factor that is activated by both all-trans retinoic acid and 9-cis retinoic acid the retinoid active derivatives of Vitamin A . They are typically found within the nucleus. As with other type II nuclear receptors, RAR heterodimerizes with RXR and in the absence of ligand, the RAR/RXR dimer binds to hormone response elements known as retinoic acid response elements (RAREs) complexed with corepressor protein. Binding of agonist ligands to RAR results in dissociation of corepressor and recruitment of coactivator protein that, in turn, promotes transcription of the downstream target gene into mRNA and eventually protein. In addition, the expression of RAR genes is under epigenetic regulation by promoter methylation. Both the length and magnitude of the retinoid response is dependent of the degradation of RARs and RXRs through the ubiquitin-proteasome. This degradation can lead to elongation of the DNA transcription through disruption of the initiation complex or to end the response to facilitate further transcriptional programs. Due to RAR/RXR heterodimers acting as subtrates to the non steroid hormone ligand retinoid they are extensively involved in cell differentiation, proliferation, and apoptosis.

See also 
 Retinoid receptor
 Retinoid X receptor

References

External links 
 

Intracellular receptors
Transcription factors